Mirjam Björklund (born 29 July 1998) is a Swedish tennis player. She has a career-high WTA singles ranking of World No. 123, achieved on 20 June 2022. She has a career-high WTA doubles ranking of World No. 281, achieved on 31 January 2022. Björklund has won one doubles WTA Challenger title as well as nine singles titles and two doubles titles on the ITF Women's Circuit.

Career
Björklund made her WTA main-draw debut at the 2017 Swedish Open, where she played Kateryna Kozlova in the first round.

At the 2022 French Open she qualified to make her Grand Slam debut, where she was drawn to face fellow qualifier Donna Vekic.

She qualified for her second Grand Slam in a row at the 2022 Wimbledon Championships.

She qualified for her first WTA 1000 tournament at the 2023 Miami Open, as an unseeded player in the qualifying draw deafeating two seeded players in a row.

Personal life
Björklund is dating Canadian tennis player Denis Shapovalov.

Grand Slam singles performance timeline 

Only main-draw results in WTA Tour, Grand Slam tournaments, Fed Cup/Billie Jean King Cup and Olympic Games are included in win–loss records.

Singles 
Current after the 2023 ATX Open.

WTA 125K series finals

Doubles: 1 (1 title)

ITF Circuit finals

Singles: 13 (9 titles, 4 runner–ups)

Doubles: 5 (2 titles, 3 runner–ups)

Notes

References

External links
 
 
 

1998 births
Living people
Swedish female tennis players
Tennis players from Stockholm
20th-century Swedish women
21st-century Swedish women